Campodarsego is a comune (municipality) in the Province of Padua in the Italian region Veneto, located about  west of Venice and about  northeast of Padua. Campodarsego has been recognized as a city and is part of the Camposampierese Municipalities Federation.

Etymology
The first act that mentions Campodarsego dates back to 1190 in which Villa Campi de Arsico is mentioned. The toponym refers to a place that was deforested and made productive near a waterway (Arsicus).

References

External links
 Official website

Cities and towns in Veneto